George Washington (also known as Washington and the Departure of the British Garrison from New York City) is a large full-length oil painted by American artist John Trumbull in 1790.

Trumbull's earlier 1790 work, Washington at Verplanck's Point, which he had gifted to Washington's wife Martha, had been very well received.  In consequence, Trumbull received a July, 1790, commission from the corporation for the City of New York, led by Mayor Richard Varick, to paint the president's portrait.

Rather than beginning anew, Trumbull enormously scaled up the prior work, enlarging it from roughly 30" by 20" to nearly four times the size, 108" by 72".   In composition and general character the two paintings are substantially the same, with only the middle background as seen through Washington's horse's legs changed, from a September 14, 1782 review of Continental Army troops he had staged for departing French commander-in-chief General Rochambeau to an idealized vision of Evacuation Day, Washington's return to New York City upon the British departure on November 25, 1783.

This painting is located in the historic Governor's Room of New York City Hall.

Background
Trumbull in a letter to his mentor, the painter Benjamin West, on August 30, 1790 wrote:

Composition
The pose and general composition are virtual of copies of Washington at Verplanck's Point painted earlier in 1790, but instead of the background seen through the horse's legs being a romanticized depiction of a review of Continental Army troops at their encampment at New York's Verplanck's Point Washington had staged for departing French commander-in-chief General Rochambeau on September 14, 1782, it is an idealized vision of Evacuation Day, Washington's return to New York City upon the British departure on November 25, 1783.  It was put on display in the Governor's Room of New York City Hall, where it remains.

Engraving
In 1899, Samuel Arlent Edwards engraved a version entitled Washington and noted as "From the painting by J. Trumbull in the City Hall, New York".

Notes

See also
 General George Washington at Trenton – full-length portrait painted in 1792 by Trumbull

References

External links
  Owner: Henry Francis du Pont Winterthur Museum
  Owner: City of New York

Paintings by John Trumbull
18th-century portraits
Paintings about the American Revolution
George Washington in art
1790 paintings
New York (state) in the American Revolution
Portraits of politicians
Horses in art
George Washington